John Robert Furness (23 August 1890 – 9 February 1968) was an Australian rules footballer who played with Fitzroy in the Victorian Football League (VFL).

Fitzroy (VFL)
He made his debut, as one of the seven new players for Fitzroy — i.e., Ernie Everett, Jack Furness, Cliff Hutton, Frank Lamont, 
Tom Moloughney, Danny Murphy, and Eric Watson — against Melbourne on 29 April 1911.

Death
He died at Hawthorn, Victoria on 9 February 1968.

Notes

External links 

1890 births
1968 deaths
Australian rules footballers from Melbourne
Fitzroy Football Club players
People from North Melbourne